Sergio Vega (born May 19, 1988, in Guadalajara, Jalisco) is a Mexican professional footballer who plays for Celaya on loan from Tijuana of Liga MX.

External links
Ascenso MX

Liga MX players
Living people
1988 births
Mexican footballers
Footballers from Guadalajara, Jalisco
Association footballers not categorized by position
21st-century Mexican people